The 2011 FK Cup was the second edition of the FK Cup. The competition held from 25 to 28 August 2011 in Boeun, Chungbuk. All matches were played at Boeun Gymnasium, Boeun.

Group stage

Group A

Group B

Group C

Knockout stage

Semifinal

Final

Winners

References

FK Cup
2011 in futsal